The Bank of China (BOC) is a Chinese majority state-owned commercial bank headquartered in Beijing and the fourth largest bank in the world.  

The Bank of China was founded in 1912 by the Republican government as China's central bank, replacing the Qing Dynasty's Ta-Ching Government Bank. It has been the second oldest bank in China still in existence after the Bank of Communications, founded in 1908. From its establishment until 1942, it issued banknotes on behalf of the Government along with the "Big Four" banks of the period: the Farmers Bank of China, Bank of Communications and Central Bank of the Republic of China. After the People's Republic was established in 1949, it has become a national commercial and foreign exchange professional bank. Its original central bank designation was carried on by the newly formed People's Bank of China. 

As of 31 December 2019, it was the second-largest lender in China overall and ninth-largest bank in the world by market capitalization value, and it is considered a systemically important bank by the Financial Stability Board. As of the end of 2020, it was the fourth-largest bank in the world in terms of total assets, ranked after the other three Chinese banks. 

The Bank of China is legally separate from its subsidiary the Bank of China (Hong Kong), although they maintain close relations in management and administration and co-operate in several areas including reselling BOC's insurance and securities services.

History

The Bank of China's history began in 1905, when the Qing government established Daqing Hubu Bank in Beijing, which was in 1908 renamed to Daqing Bank. When the Republic of China was established in 1912, Chen Jintao was named head of financial reform in President Sun Yat-sen's government. Chen Jintao transformed the bank into the Bank of China, becoming its founder.

After the Chinese Civil War ended in 1949, the Bank of China effectively split into two operations. Part of the bank relocated to Taiwan with the Kuomintang (KMT) government, and was privatized in 1971 to become the International Commercial Bank of China. In 2002, it merged with Jiaotong Bank to become the Mega International Commercial Bank. The Mainland operation is the current entity known as the Bank of China.

It is the second largest lender in China overall, and the fifth largest bank in the world by market capitalization value. Once 100% owned by the central government, via China Central Huijin and National Council for Social Security Fund (SSF), an Initial public offering (IPO) of its shares took place in June 2006, the free float is at present over 26%. In the Forbes Global 2000 it ranked as the 4th-largest company in the world.

It is the most globally-active of China's banks, with branches on every inhabited continent. Outside of mainland China, BOC also operates in 27 countries and areas including Australia, Canada, United Kingdom, Ireland, France, Germany, Italy, Luxembourg, Russia, Hungary, United States, Panama, Brazil, Japan, Republic of Korea, Singapore, Taiwan, Philippines, Vietnam, Malaysia, Thailand, Indonesia, Kazakhstan, Bahrain, Zambia, South Africa, and a branch office in the Cayman Islands.  In December 2010, the Bank of China New York branch began offering renminbi products for Americans. It was the first major Chinese bank to offer such a product.

Although it is present in the above countries/territories, its operations outside China accounted for less than 4% of the activity of the bank by both profits and assets. Mainland China accounts for 60% of the bank by profits and 76% by assets as at December 2005.

Timeline of overseas activities

 1917: BOC opened a branch in Hong Kong.
 1929: BOC opened its first overseas branch in London. The branch managed the government's foreign debt, became a center for the bank's management of its foreign exchange, and acted as an intermediary for China's international trade.
 1931: BOC opened a branch in Osaka.
 1936: BOC opened a branch in Singapore to handle remittances to China of overseas Chinese. It also opened an agency in New York.
 1937: On the outbreak of hostilities with Japan, Japanese forces blockaded China's major ports. BOC opened a number of branches in Batavia, Penang, Kuala Lumpur, Haiphong, Hanoi, Rangoon, Bombay, and Calcutta to facilitate the gathering of remittances and the flow of military supplies. It also opened sub-agencies in Surabaya, Medan, Dabo, Batu Pahat, Baichilu, Mandalay, Lashio, Ipoh, and Seremban.
 1941-1942: The Japanese conquest of Southeast Asia forced BOC to close all overseas its branches, agencies, sub-branches and sub-agencies, except London, New York, Calcutta, and Bombay. Nevertheless, in 1942, it managed to set up six new overseas branches, such as in Sydney, (Australia), Liverpool, and Havana, and possibly Karachi.
 1946: BOC reopened its branches and agencies in Hong Kong, Singapore, Haiphong, Rangoon, Kuala Lumpur, Penang, and Jakarta. It moved the Hanoi agency to Saigon. At the suggestion of the Allied Forces Headquarters, it liquidated the branch in Osaka and opened a sub-branch in Tokyo.
 1947: BOC opened agencies in Bangkok, Chittagong, and Tokyo.
 1950: After victory of Communist forces in the civil war, some branches (ex. Hong Kong, Singapore, London, Penang, Kuala Lumpur, Jakarta, Calcutta, Bombay, Chittagong, and Karachi) of Bank of China joined the bank headquartered in Beijing, while others (ex. New York, Tokyo, Havana, Bangkok, and one other, possibly Panama) opted to remain with the Bank of China headquartered in Taipei. In 1971, this bank took the name International Commercial Bank of China.
 1963: The Burmese government nationalized all banks, foreign and domestic, including the Bank of China's Rangoon branch.
 1971: The Bank of China transferred its two branches in Karachi and Chittagong to the National Bank of Pakistan.
 1975: The Republic of South Vietnam nationalized the Bank of China's branch in Saigon and the Khmer Rouge government nationalized its Phnom Penh branch.
 1979: BOC opened a branch in Luxembourg, which gradually became its European headquarters through the 1990s.
 1981: BOC opened a branch in New York.
 1985: BOC opened a branch in Paris (France)
 1987: BOC became an ordinary member of the LBMA.
 1992: BOC opens a representative office in Toronto.
 1993: Bank of China (Canada) established to conduct business in Canada as a Schedule II bank.
 2001: Kwangtung Provincial Bank was closed and merged under Bank of China, Singapore Branch.
 2002: Bank of China Futures Pte Ltd wound up operations in Singapore.
 2005: In the runup to its initial public offering, BOC solicited long term investors to take strategic stakes in the company, including a $3.1 billion investment by the Royal Bank of Scotland Group PLC and further investments by Swiss bank UBS AG and Temasek Holdings (who also promised to subscribe for an additional $500 million worth of shares during the IPO). The Bank was also investigated by the United States in its money laundering probe related to the superdollars affair.
 2006: BOC's listing on the Hong Kong Stock Exchange on June 1, 2006, was the largest IPO since 2000 and the fourth largest IPO ever, raising some US$9.7 billion in the H-share Global Offering. The Over-Allotment Option was then exercised on June 7, 2006, raising the total value of their IPO to US$11.2 billion. BOC also made a successful IPO in mainland China on July 5, 2006, offering up to 10 billion A-shares on the Shanghai A Stock Exchange for RMB20 billion (US$2.5 billion). BOC also bought Singapore Airlines's stake in Singapore Aircraft Leasing Enterprise, renaming it BOC Aviation in 2007.
 2008: Bank of China buys a 20 percent stake in La Compagnie Financière Edmond de Rothschild (LCFR) for 236.3 million euros (US$340 million)
 2001-2007: Massive staff layoffs and paycuts in BOC Singapore Branch, culminating in 2007 with branch head Zhu Hua being asked to leave by the Monetary Authority of Singapore for his poor performance. He was replaced by Liu Yan Fen.
 2008: Head of Settlements at BOC, Chin Chuh Meng, was investigated involvement for Multi-Level Marketing Activities in Singapore, a scheme involving employees of the Bank of China and ex-Kwangtung Bank.
 2009: Opened branches in São Paulo and Maputo. Penang branch reopened in October. People's Park Remittance Centre opened in Singapore. Sunday Banking Business ceased in Chinatown Sub-branch in Singapore.
 2012: BOC opened branch in Taiwan. The opening is seen as a symbol of deepening economic ties across Taiwan Strait Bank of China (M) Bhd opened its 6th branch in Malaysia at Tower 2, PFCC, Bandar Puteri Puchong in 2012.
 2013: BOC opened a branch in Lisbon, Portugal. During the Korean crisis, the Bank of China halted business with a North Korean bank accused by the United States of financing Pyongyang's missile and nuclear programs. New branch opened in Montreal. The Canadian arm of the Bank of China now has 10 branches across Canada, including five in the Greater Toronto Area and three in Vancouver.
 2015: BOC gained entry to the London Bullion Market Association gold price auction. At the time, it was one of eight members to the auction.
 2015 BoC opened two global commodity centres in Singapore, becoming the first Chinese bank to do so outside China.
 2016 BoC received permission to open a branch in Brunei.
2016 BoC opened a branch in Mauritius becoming the first Chinese-funded bank in Mauritius.
 2017 BoC received permission to operate a deposit bank in Turkey.
 2017 In October 2017, BoC opened its first branch in Pakistan in Karachi, Pakistan.

Major subsidiaries

Hong Kong

BOC started operations in Hong Kong in 1917. It became a note-issuing bank in Hong Kong in 1994, and in Macau in 1995.

In 2001, BOC regrouped its Hong Kong operations into Bank of China (Hong Kong); then BOCHK listed on the Hong Kong Stock Exchange in October 2002. Two-thirds of its share capital are in free float. The bank's headquarters in Hong Kong are located in the Bank of China Tower, designed by the renowned architect I.M. Pei, and was opened to the public in 1990 as the tallest building in Hong Kong at that time.

It listed on the Hong Kong Stock Exchange (independently from BOCHK) (SEHK:3988) by floating the largest initial public offering (IPO) in the world by any institution since 2000 on June 1, 2006, raising US$9.7 billion. The IPO attracted HK$286 billion (US$36.7 billion) in retail orders and was the most heavily oversubscribed in the history of the Hong Kong Stock Exchange. The offer was around 76 times oversubscribed. Although some financial analysts advised caution due to the worrying amounts of non-performing loans, this hardly deterred investors. The IPO share price started at HK$2.95 per share and jumped 15% (to HK$3.40) after the first day of trading.

In 2008, the Bank of China was crowned Deal of the Year - Debt Market Deal of the Year at the 2008 ALB Hong Kong Law Awards.

Canada

Bank of China (Canada), commonly known as BOCC, is the Canadian subsidiary of the Bank of China (BOC). The Bank of China began its business in Canada by opening a representative office in Toronto on September 8, 1992. BOCC was incorporated as a subsidiary of BOC in 1993 under Schedule II of the Bank Act. BOCC provides the following types of banking services in Canada:  bank accounts to both personal and commercial banking clients, remittance services (including bank drafts and wire transfers), loans and mortgages, foreign exchange services, and China visa application assistance services where by it acts as agent, however plans for a China Visa Application Centre are being made and it is anticipated that the  Consulate General of the People's Republic of China in Toronto will entrust all future China Visa applications to Bank of China Canada's Visa Application Centre.

In Canada, BOCC has ten locations located in Markham, Toronto (several branches, in downtown, North York and Scarborough], Mississauga, Vancouver, Montreal, and Calgary. It previously had branches in Burnaby and Richmond. As well, the bank is a member of the Canadian Bankers Association (CBA); registered member with the Canada Deposit Insurance Corporation (CDIC), a federal agency insuring deposits at all of Canada's chartered banks; and, a member of Interac, which handles transactions between automated teller machines of different banks and debit card transactions.

Banknotes

Although it is not a central bank, the Bank of China is licensed to issue banknotes in two of China's Special Administrative Regions. Until 1942, the Bank of China issued banknotes in mainland China on behalf of the Government of the Republic of China. Today, the Bank issues banknotes in Hong Kong and banknotes in Macau (under the Portuguese name "Banco da China, Sucursal de Macau"), along with other commercial banks in those regions.

Ownership

As of 30 September 2015, largest shareholders of the Bank of China ordinary shares (both A shares and H shares) were:
 China Central Huijin (an investment arm of the government of the People's Republic of China): 64.63% (A shares)
 HKSCC Nominees Limited (nominee account): 27.78% (H shares)
 China Securities Finance (state-owned legal person): 2.90% (A shares)

As of 30 September 2015, largest shareholders of the Bank of China preference shares (both domestic and offshore) were:
 The Bank of New York Mellon (custodian bank): 39.96% (offshore)
 China Mobile Communications: 18.01% (domestic)
 China National Tobacco Corporation: 5.00% (domestic)
 Zhongwei Real Estate: 3.00% (domestic)

Leaders

Current Chairman 

Liu Liange (刘连舸), President and vice-chairman of the board since 2015.

Past Chairman 

Chen Siqing (:zh:陈四清), former president and chairman, current chairman of Industrial and Commercial Bank of China.

Controversies

Guarantee scandal in Poland

After COVEC withdrew from completing its construction of the A2 highway in Poland, Bank of China was to pay a performance guarantee to the Polish government's road organization GDDKiA. However, with Export-Import Bank of China, they refused to pay this; only Deutsche Bank honoured its obligations under the court decision.

Wultz v. Bank of China

On August 8, 2008, the family of Daniel Wultz, an American teenager killed in a 2006 terrorist attack in Israel, filed suit against the Bank of China in U.S. District Court for the District of Columbia. The case was subsequently transferred to the United States District Court, Southern District of New York, where litigation continues. On October 29, 2012, the Honorable J. Scheindlin issued a ruling compelling Bank of China to provide discovery.

Alleged money transfers to Hamas

In 2012, the families of eight terror victims of the 2008 Mercaz HaRav massacre in Jerusalem filed a  lawsuit against the Bank of China. The suit asserted that in 2003 the bank's New York branch wired millions of dollars to Hamas from its leadership in Syria and Iran. The Bank of China subsequently denied providing banking services to terrorist groups: "The Bank of China has always strictly followed the UN's anti-money laundering and anti-terrorist financing requirements and regulations in China and other judicial areas where we operate."

Money laundering

In 2014 BOC denied China Central Television reports of money laundering.

See also

 List of largest banks
 List of asset management companies of the People's Republic of China
 Foreign exchange reserves of the People's Republic of China
 BOC Aviation - Singapore-based aircraft leasing company owned by BOC

References

Resources

 Bank of China, A History of the Bank of China, 1912-1949, Beijing: 1999.

External links
 

 

 
Companies in the Hang Seng Index
Government-owned companies of China
Companies based in Beijing
Chinese brands
H shares
Systemically important financial institutions
Companies listed on the Shanghai Stock Exchange
Companies in the CSI 100 Index
Companies listed on the Hong Kong Stock Exchange
Banks established in 1912
Xicheng District
Chinese companies established in 1912
Multinational companies headquartered in China
Government-owned banks
Banknote issuers of Hong Kong
Banknote issuers of Macau